Only the Strong is the second album by the Canadian/American heavy metal band Thor, released in 1985. The singles "Let the Blood Run Red", "Knock 'Em Down", and "Thunder on the Tundra" helped the album reach platinum status in Canada and the United Kingdom. "Let the Blood Run Red" and "Thunder on the Tundra" peaked, respectively, at Nos. 91 and 89 on the UK Singles Chart.

Track listing

Notes 
2000 reissue
 Tracks 12-13 recorded Live Pinktooth Brush, U.K. 06/13/1985

2021 Bonus Tracks
 Tracks 12-15: from "The Edge Of Hell" (1987)
 Tracks 16: 1983 demo of "Scratch and Destroy" recorded at A Step Above Studios, NY
 Tracks 17: Recorded in 1983 at A Step Above Studios, NY. Additional recording in 1988
 Tracks 18: 1981 demo of "Anger" recorded at Moshroom Studios, Vancouver, BC & Thunder Sound Studios, New Westminster, BC
 Tracks 19: 1986 demo of "Thunderhawk" recorded at Thunderhawk International Studios
 Tracks 20: Recorded in 1981 at Moshroom Studios, Vancouver, BC & Thunder Sound Studios, New Westminster, BC. Additional recording in 1988 at Thunder Sound Studios, New Westminster, BC

Bonus DVD
 Tracks 1-6: Marquee, London 1984
 Tracks 7: Great Yarmouth Festival 1984
 Tracks 8: Connecticut 1983
 Tracks 9: New York 1983
 Tracks 10: New York 1982
 Tracks 11: Washington DC 1982
 Tracks 12: Great Yarmouth Festival 1984
 Tracks 13: Vancouver, Canada 1984
 Tracks 14: United Kingdom Tour 1984

Credits 

 Jon Mikl Thor – vocals
 Steve Price – guitar
 Keith Zazzi – bass, backing vocals
 Mike Favata – drums
 Cherry Bomb (aka Rusty Hamilton) – backing vocals

Production 
 Produced by Tom Doherty
 Engineers: John Dent, Tony Harris

References

1985 albums
Thor (band) albums